The Master of the Legend of the Magdalen (sometimes called the Master of the Magdalen Legend) was an Early Netherlandish painter, active from about 1483 to around 1527.  He has not been identified; his name of convenience is derived from a large, now-dispersed altarpiece with scenes from the life of Mary Magdalene, which has been dated to between 1515 and 1520 based on the costumes of the donor portraits. However other works attributed to him are extremely difficult to date with any accuracy. Many paintings have been linked with the triptych, which is thought to have been finished late in the artist's career. Other major works include his two Magdalen panels in London.

He is not to be confused with the "Master of the Mansi Magdalen" (fl. ?Antwerp, c. 1515–25) or the Magdalen Master (fl. Florence, c. 1265–90).

Some of his portraits suggest a possible link with artists in Brussels, and it is thought that he worked there, and headed a large workshop.  An early influence appears to have been Rogier van der Weyden; his work also shares characteristics with that of Bernard van Orley, and a link with the Master of the Death of the Virgin (Joos Van Cleve) has been suggested.  Like van Orley, this artist is believed to have been active in the court of Margaret of Habsburg, regent of the Netherlands from 1507 until 1530.  Works ascribed to the Master are in the collections of the National Gallery, London, the Philadelphia Museum of Art and the Fitzwilliam Museum in Cambridge.

He is sometimes associated with Pieter van Coninxloo based on similarities of style, time and location. A number of art historians, including Max Friedländer, who first made the association between the works now attributed to the Master of the Legend of the Magdalen, have speculated that they may have been the same person. It is possible also that van Coninxloo for a time was a member of the master's workshop.

Works

Thirteen versions of a portrait format image of "The Magdalen" were painted by the Master of the Magdalen Legend and his workshop between the years of 1510-20. This piece in particular was originally thought to depict Mary of Burgundy under the guise of the Magdalen, but it has since been discovered to be her daughter, Margaret of Austria. The faint gilding in the shape of a halo above the head of the sitter implies it is of a saint, and she wears a dress similar to those worn by 16th century courtesans, which was representative of Mary Magdalene's sinful past. The jar of ointment which she holds was the usual attribute of the Magdalen, as she was known for pouring this ointment on Jesus's feet.

Notes

Sources
Campbell, Lorne. The Fifteenth Century Netherlandish Schools. London: National Gallery Publications, 1998. 

1480s births
1520s deaths
Legend of the Magdalen, Master of the
Early Netherlandish painters
Artists from Brussels